The May Fairy (Czech: Pohádka máje) is a 1926 Czech silent romance film directed by Karl Anton based on a Vilém Mrštík's novel. It is credited with helping to introduce the tradition of lyricism in Czech cinema.
It was shot in several locations including Prague and Vienna. Another adaptation of the novel was made in 1940 by Otakar Vávra.

Cast
Ferdinand Kaňkovský as Forester  
Anna Opplová as Forester's Wife  
Anita Janová as Helenka  
Jarmila Horáková as Gusta  
Berta Reifová as Albína  
George Voskovec as Ríša 
Ludvík Veverka as Ríša's Friend  
Antonín Marek as Priest  
Betty Kysilková as Priest's Housekeeper  
Božena Svobodová as Ríša's Landlady  
Mary Jansová as Waiter  
Marie Počepická as Marta  
František Fišer as Jenyš  
Saša Dobrovolná as Jenyš's Mother 
Jindřich Lhoták as Nikolaus von Rittenburg  
Jan Richter as Policeman  
Ladislav H. Struna as Pimp  
Helena Zmatlíková as Helenka

Release
The film was reconstructed in 2005 and re-released in cinemas with live music by Neuvěřitelno.

References

External links

Czech silent feature films
Czech romantic films
1920s romance films
Films directed by Karl Anton
Czech black-and-white films